Yves Allegro (born 24 August 1978) is a retired Swiss professional tennis player. He is a doubles specialist and is well known as compatriot Roger Federer's doubles partner and friend. Allegro and Federer teamed up in doubles at the Australian Open in 2003 and 2004.

On 9 December 2019 at a hearing at the District Court of Sierra, Allegro received a two year suspended sentence for sexual coercion. The offence occurred in October 2014 while in Tallinn, Estonia towards an ex-Austrian player. Allegro appealed against the verdict.

Tournament Director
In 2020, Allegro founded an ITF M25 tennis tournament that took place in Sierre, Valais. Rinky Hijikata won the 2021 edition. The Swiss Remy Bertola  won the 2022 edition.

ATP career finals

Doubles: 10 (3–7)

References

External links
 
 
 

1978 births
Living people
Swiss male tennis players
Olympic tennis players of Switzerland
Tennis players at the 2004 Summer Olympics